Aethilla is a Neotropical genus of spread-winged skippers in the family Hesperiidae.

Species
Aethilla chiapa (Freeman, 1969) — Mexico
Aethilla echina (Hewitson, 1870) — Mexico to Colombia
A. echina echina — Ecuador
A. echina coracina (Butler, 1870) — Brazil
Aethilla eleusinia (Hewitson, 1868) — Ecuador
Aethilla epicra (Hewitson, 1870) — Ecuador, Colombia
Aethilla gigas (Mabille, 1877) — Ecuador, Peru
Aethilla haber (Mabille, 1891) — Peru
Aethilla later (Mabille, 1891) — Peru
Aethilla lavochrea (Butler, 1872) — Mexico, Costa Rica, Panama
Aethilla melas (Plötz, 1882) — Brazil
Aethilla memmius (Butler, 1870) — Venezuela

References

External links
images representing Aethilla at Consortium for the Barcode of Life

Hesperiidae of South America
Hesperiidae genera
Taxa named by William Chapman Hewitson